Echinops chantavicus is a species of flowering plant in the genus Echinops, native to Central Asia.

References 

chantavicus
Flora of Central Asia